Johan Sigismund Hassius Lillienpalm (1664-1729) was a Norwegian civil servant and government official.  He served as the Diocesan Governor of Christianssand stiftamt from 1718 until 1728. He became a noble in January 1718, receiving the noble name Lillienpalm. His family line died out in the early 1800s.

References

1664 births
1729 deaths
County governors of Norway